Stenostola anomala is a species of beetle in the family Cerambycidae. It was described by Henry Walter Bates in 1884. It is known from Japan.

Varietas
 Stenostola anomala var. ohbayashii Breuning, 1950
 Stenostola anomala var. gleneoides (Gressitt, 1935)

References

Saperdini
Beetles described in 1884